The Northern Territory Minister for Corporate Information Services is a Minister of the Crown in the Government of the Northern Territory. The minister administers their portfolio through the Department of Corporate and Information Services.

The Minister is responsible for advice on corporate tax legislation, asset systems, banking arrangements, government office accommodation, information, communications and technology policy and governance, the government vehicle fleet, print management, public sector corporate services, public sector information systems and services, public sector workers' compensation administration and the records service.

The current minister is Lauren Moss (Labor). She was sworn in on 12 September 2016 following the Labor victory at the 2016 election.

Ministers for Corporate Information Services

Former posts

Information, Communications and Technology Policy

References

Northern Territory-related lists
Ministers of the Northern Territory government